Aforia abyssalis is a species of sea snail, a marine gastropod mollusk in the family Cochlespiridae.

This species is also considered the type species of Abyssaforia Sysoev & Kantor, 1987

Description

Distribution
This marine species is found off Hokkaido, Japan.

References

External links
 BioLib: Aforia abyssalis

abyssalis
Gastropods described in 1987